Section 2 may refer to:

 Section 2 (NYSPHSAA), a section of the New York State Public High School Athletic Association
 Section 2 of the Canadian Charter of Rights and Freedoms
 Section 2 of the Constitution of Australia
 Section 2 of the UK's Mental Health Act 1983
Section 2 (album), an album by The Howling Hex

See also

MI2, British Military Intelligence Section 2